The Swiss Family Robinson (German: Der Schweizerische Robinson, "The Swiss Robinsons") is a novel by Johann David Wyss, first published in 1812, about a Swiss family of immigrants whose ship en route to Port Jackson, Australia, goes off course and is shipwrecked in the East Indies.  The ship's crew is lost, but the family and several domestic animals survive.  They make their way to shore, where they build a settlement, undergoing several adventures before being rescued; some refuse rescue and remain on the island.

The book is the most successful of a large number of "Robinsonade" novels that were written in response to the success of Defoe's Robinson Crusoe (1719). It has gone through a large number of versions and adaptations.

History
Written by Swiss writer, Johann David Wyss, edited by his son Johann Rudolf Wyss, and illustrated by another son, Johann Emmanuel Wyss, the novel was intended to teach his four sons about family values, good farming, and the uses of the natural world and self-reliance. Wyss' attitude towards its education is in line with the teachings of Jean-Jacques Rousseau, and many chapters involve Christian-oriented moral lessons such as frugality, husbandry, acceptance, and cooperation.

Wyss presents adventures as lessons in natural history and physical science. This resembles other educational books for young ones published about the same time. These include Charlotte Turner Smith's Rural Walks: in Dialogues intended for the use of Young Persons (1795), Rambles Farther: A continuation of Rural Walks (1796), and A Natural History of Birds, intended chiefly for young persons (1807). But Wyss' novel is also modeled after Daniel Defoe's Robinson Crusoe, an adventure story about a shipwrecked sailor first published in 1719.

The book presents a geographically impossible array of large mammals and plants that probably could never have existed together on a single island, for the children's education, nourishment, clothing, and convenience.

Over the years, there have been many versions of the story with episodes added, changed, or deleted. Perhaps the best-known English version is by William H. G. Kingston, first published in 1879. It is based on Isabelle de Montolieu's 1814 French adaptation and 1824 continuation (from chapter 37) Le Robinson suisse, ou, Journal d'un père de famille, naufragé avec ses enfants in which were added further adventures of Fritz, Ernest, Jack, and Franz. Other English editions that claim to include the whole of the Wyss-Montolieu narrative are by W. H. Davenport Adams (1869–1910) and Mrs H. B. Paull (1879). As Carpenter and Prichard write in The Oxford Companion to Children's Literature (Oxford, 1995), "with all the expansions and contractions over the past two centuries (this includes a long history of abridgments, condensations, Christianizing, and Disney products), Wyss's original narrative has long since been obscured." The closest English translation to the original is that of the Juvenile Library in 1816, published by the husband and wife team William Godwin and Mary Jane Clairmont, reprinted by Penguin Classics.

Although movie and television adaptations typically name the family "Robinson", it is not a Swiss name. The German title translates as The Swiss Robinson which identifies the novel as part of the Robinsonade genre, rather than a story about a family named Robinson.

Plot

The novel opens with the titular family in the hold of a sailing ship, weathering a great storm. The ship's crew evacuates without them, so William, Elizabeth, and their four sons (Fritz, Ernest, Jack, and Franz) are left to survive alone. As the ship tosses about, William prays that God will spare them.

The ship survives the night, and the family finds themselves within sight of a tropical desert island. The following day, they decide to get to the island they can see beyond the reef. With much effort, they construct a vessel out of tubs. After they fill the tubs with food, ammunition, and other items of value they can safely carry, they row toward the island. Two dogs from the ship, Turk and Juno, swim beside them. The ship's cargo of livestock (including a cow, a donkey, two goats, six sheep, a ram, a pig, chickens, ducks, geese, and pigeons), guns and powder, carpentry tools, books, a disassembled pinnace and provisions have survived.

Upon reaching the island, the family set up a makeshift camp. William knows that they must prepare for a long time on the island and his thoughts are as much on provisions for the future as on their immediate wants. William and his oldest son Fritz spend the next day exploring the island.

The family spends the next few days securing themselves against hunger. William and Fritz make several trips to the ship to bring everything useful from the vessel ashore. The domesticated animals on the ship are towed back to the island. There is also a great store of firearms and ammunition, hammocks for sleeping, carpenter's tools, lumber, cooking utensils, silverware, and dishes. Initially, they construct a treehouse, but as time passes (and after Elizabeth is injured climbing the stairs down from it), they settle in a more permanent dwelling in part of a cave. Fritz rescues a young Englishwoman named Jenny Montrose, who was shipwrecked elsewhere on their island.

The book covers more than ten years. William and the older boys explore various environments and develop homes and gardens at various sites about the island. Ultimately, the father wonders if they will ever see the rest of humanity again. Eventually, a British ship that is in search of Jenny Montrose anchors near the island and is discovered by the family. The captain is given the journal containing the story of their life on the island, which is eventually published. Several family members continue to live tranquilly on their island, while several return to Europe with the British.

Characters

The principal characters of the book (including Isabelle de Montolieu's adaptations and continuation) are:
 William (unnamed in the original) – The patriarch of the family. He is the narrator of the story and leads the family. He knows an enormous amount of information on almost everything the family comes across, demonstrating bravery and self-reliance. The German text calls him a Schweizer-Prediger (Swiss preacher), but this detail is absent from English and French translations.
 Elizabeth (unnamed in the original) – The loving mother of the family. She is intelligent and resourceful, arming herself even before leaving the ship with a "magic bag" filled with supplies, including sewing materials and seeds for food crops. She is also a remarkably versatile cook, taking on anything from porcupine soup to roast penguins.
 Fritz – The oldest of the four boys, he is 15. Fritz is intelligent but impetuous. He is the strongest and accompanies his father on many quests.
 Ernest – The second oldest of the boys is 13. Ernest is the most intelligent, but a less physically active boy, often described by his father as "indolent". Like Fritz, however, he comes to be an excellent shot.
 Jack – The third oldest of the boys, 11 years old. He is thoughtless, bold, energetic, and the quickest in the group.
 Franz (sometimes translated as Francis) – The youngest of the boys, he is eight years old when the story opens. He usually stays home with his mother.
 Turk – The family's English dog.
 Juno – The family's Danish dog.
 Nip (also called Knips or Nips in some editions; called Knips in the German) – An orphan monkey adopted by the family after their dogs Turk and Juno have killed his mother. The family uses him to test for poisonous fruits.
 Fangs – A jackal that is tamed by the family.

In the novel, the family is not called "Robinson" as their surname is not mentioned; the intention of the title is to compare them to Robinson Crusoe. However, in 1900, Jules Verne published The Castaways of the Flag (alternatively known as Second Fatherland), where he revisits the original shipwreck. In this sequel, of the family's final years on the original island, the family is called Zermatt.

Other adaptations
The novels, in one form or another, have also been adapted numerous times, sometimes changing location and time period:

Book sequels 
 Le Robinson suisse, ou, Journal d'un père de famille, naufragé avec ses enfants (1824) by Isabelle de Montolieu, new edition of the novel with further adventures.
 Willis the Pilot: a sequel to The Swiss family Robinson; or, Adventures of an emigrant family wrecked on an unknown coast of the Pacific Ocean (1858) has been attributed to Johann Wyss or to Johanna Spyri, author of Heidi.
 Second Fatherland (Seconde patrie, 1900), by Jules Verne takes up the story at the point where Wyss's tale left off. It was first published in English in two volumes, Their Island Home and Castaways of the Flag, and later in a single volume as Castaways of the Flag.
  Return to Robinson Island (2015), by T. J. Hoisington, based on the original 1812 Swiss Family Robinson novel.

Audio adaptations 
In 1963, the novel was dramatized by the Tale Spinners for Children series (United Artists Records UAC 11059) performed by the Famous Theatre Company.

Film versions 
 Swiss Family Robinson (1940 film)
 Swiss Cheese Family Robinson (Mighty Mouse short, 1947)
 Swiss Family Robinson (1958, TV movie)
 Swiss Family Robinson (1960 Walt Disney live-action film)
 Lost in Space (1998, inspired by the series which was inspired by the book)

Made-for-TV movies 
 Swiss Family Robinson: Lost in the Jungle (1957) — Unaired pilot for a hypotethical series, released in DVD only in 2000.
 Swiss Family Robinson (1958) — Starring Laraine Day, Walter Pidgeon, Dennis Hopper and Patty Duke.
 The Swiss Family Robinson (1973) – Animated adaptation.
 The Swiss Family Robinson (1975) — pilot to the American series of the same year.
 Beverly Hills Family Robinson (1998)
 The New Swiss Family Robinson (1998) — Starring Jane Seymour, James Keach and David Carradine.
 Stranded (2002)

Television series 
 English Family Robinson (1957) — British series, believed to be lost.
 Lost in Space (1965–1968) — A science fiction adaptation in which the Robinsons are a family of explorers whose spacecraft goes off course.
 Swiss Family Robinson (1973) — Episode 14 of animated series Festival of Family Classics by Rankin/Bass.
 Swiss Family Robinson (1974) —  Canadian series starring Chris Wiggins.
 Swiss Family Robinson (1975) — American series starring Martin Milner.
 The Swiss Family Robinson: Flone of the Mysterious Island (1981) — A Japanese anime series.
 The Swiss Family Jetson (1986) — An episode of the animated series The Jetsons modeled after Johann Wyss's book.
 The Adventures of Swiss Family Robinson (1998) — New Zealand series starring Richard Thomas.
 Lost in Space (2018 – 2021) — A Netflix adaptation of the 1965 Lost in Space.
 Swiss Family Robinson (TBA) — A Disney+ adaptation currently in development.

Direct-to-video films 

 Swiss Family Robinson (1996)

Comic book series 
 Swiss Family Robinson (1947) — Classics Illustrated adaptation of the original novel
 Space Family Robinson (1962–1984) — science fiction adaptation
 Swiss Family Mouse n' Sons (c. 1962) — straight adaptation with the Disney characters playing the roles

Stage adaptations 
 Swiss Family Robinson written by Jerry Montoya and performed at B Street Theatre in Sacramento, California, in 2009.

Computer adventure game 
 Swiss Family Robinson created in 1984 by Tom Snyder Productions for the Apple II and Commodore 64, published under the Windham Classics label.  The player takes the role of Fritz, the eldest brother.

Parody 
 The New Swiss Family Robinson by Owen Wister (1882).

See also

 The Admirable Crichton
 Cast Away
 The Coral Island
 Lost in Space
 Robinson Crusoe

Footnotes

References
 
 Wyss, Johann. The Swiss Family Robinson, ed. John Seelye. Penguin Classics, 2007. The only unabridged complete text genuinely by Wyss (and his son) is currently in print.

External links

 The Swiss Family Robinson, available at Internet Archive (original edition scanned books with illustrations in color)
 The Swiss Family Robinson, available at Google Books (original edition scanned books with illustrations)
  (plain text and HTML). Version unknown, ca. 1850, missing two pages of text.
  (plain text). Kingston's 1879 translation.
Original German text on Google Books
 "A Note on Wyss's Swiss Family Robinson, Montolieu's Le Robinson suisse, and Kingston's 1879 text", by Ellen Moody. Information about the book and its many versions.
 

 
1812 German-language novels
Swiss children's novels
Novels set on fictional islands
Novels set on uninhabited islands
Swiss novels adapted into films
Novels about survival skills
Swiss novels adapted into television shows
Novels set in the Indian Ocean
1810s children's books